Saxe Pond is a small lake reservoir located in Bradford County, Pennsylvania.

See also
List of lakes in Pennsylvania

References

Bodies of water of Bradford County, Pennsylvania